Lizandra Lusson Miranda (born 29 September 1986) is a Cuban handball player for BM Remudas and the Cuban national team.

She participated at the 2011 World Women's Handball Championship in Brazil. and the 2015 World Women's Handball Championship in Denmark.

Individual Achiviements
Top Scorer:
2015 Pan American Games

References

External links

1986 births
Living people
Sportspeople from Havana
Cuban female handball players
Cuban expatriate sportspeople in Spain
Handball players at the 2007 Pan American Games
Handball players at the 2015 Pan American Games
Handball players at the 2019 Pan American Games
Pan American Games medalists in handball
Pan American Games silver medalists for Cuba
Pan American Games bronze medalists for Cuba
Expatriate handball players
Medalists at the 2019 Pan American Games
21st-century Cuban women